German submarine U-287 was a Type VIIC U-boat of Nazi Germany's Kriegsmarine during World War II. The submarine was laid down on 8 August 1942 at the Bremer Vulkan yard at Bremen-Vegesack as yard number 52. She was launched on 13 August 1943 and commissioned on 22 September under the command of Oberleutnant zur See Heinrich Meyer. She did not sink or damage any ships.

Official records report that she was sunk by a mine in May 1945 in the Elbe estuary. But late interviews with crew members support that she was scuttled. According to these sources the remaining four crew members convinced British investigators they were struck by a mine. This version avoided the whole crew for being charged for destroying the sub which was supposed to be handed over to allies forces according to German Instrument of Surrender.

Design
German Type VIIC submarines were preceded by the shorter Type VIIB submarines. U-287 had a displacement of  when at the surface and  while submerged. She had two shafts and two  propellers.

U-287 was fitted with five  torpedo tubes (four fitted at the bow and one at the stern), fourteen torpedoes, one  SK C/35 naval gun, 220 rounds, and two twin  C/30 anti-aircraft guns. The boat had a complement of between forty-four and sixty.

Service history
U-287 served with the 24th U-boat Flotilla for training from September 1943 to February 1945 and operationally with the 31st flotilla from 1 March.

The boat's only patrol was preceded by two short voyages from Kiel in April 1945 to Horten Naval Base and Kristiansand in Norway (the former being located northeast of Kristiansand).

Patrol and loss
The boat departed Kristiansand on 29 April 1945 and was stayed in the Elbe estuary. The whole crew but four evacuated on lifeboats to Altenbruch before the remaining crew scuttled the ship near Schelenkuhlen in the Elbe river on 16 May. They testified that they were sunk by a mine, which was documented as the official reason of loss.

References

Bibliography

External links

German Type VIIC submarines
U-boats commissioned in 1943
U-boats sunk in 1945
World War II submarines of Germany
1943 ships
Ships built in Bremen (state)
Maritime incidents in May 1945